Philippe Rebbot is a French actor. He appeared in more than eighty films since 1998 and starred in several films including The Aquatic Effect, Une famille à louer and Northern Wind.

Filmography

Personal life
In 2004, Rebbot met the actress Romane Bohringer, on the set of the TV Movie Le Triporteur de Belleville. On 26 December 2008 Romane gave birth to their first child, a baby girl named Rose, and on 2 August 2011 she gave birth to Raoul, a boy.

References

External links 

Living people
French male film actors
1964 births